is a Judo throw and one of the techniques adopted by the Kodokan into their Shinmeisho No Waza (newly accepted techniques) list. It is categorized as a hip technique, or Koshi-waza. Sode Tsurikomi Goshi translates as sleeve lifting pulling hip throw.

Technique Description 
Sode Tsuri Komi Goshi is a hip throw used in Judo. It is performed by taking a grip on both opponents sleeves, holding one high above the head—the right one when done right-handed—turning in to face the same direction as the opponent, and pulling them over the hips.

See also 
Judo Techniques by type.
List of Kodokan Judo techniques by rank.

References

External links
Demonstration

Judo technique
Throw (grappling)